This is a list of known or suspected fatal cougar attacks that occurred in North America by decade in chronological order. The cougar is also commonly known as mountain lion, puma, mountain cat, catamount, or panther. The sub-population in Florida is known as the Florida panther.

A total of 126 attacks, 27 of which were fatal, have been documented in North America in the past 100 years. Fatal cougar attacks are extremely rare and occur much less frequently than fatal snake bites, fatal lightning strikes, or fatal bee stings. Children are particularly vulnerable. The majority of the child victims listed here were not accompanied by adults.

As with many predators, a cougar may attack if cornered, if a fleeing human stimulates their instinct to chase, or if a person "plays dead." Standing still however may cause the cougar to consider a person easy prey. Exaggerating the threat to the animal through intense eye contact, loud shouting, and any other action to appear larger and more menacing, may make the animal retreat. 

Humans are capable of fending off cougars, as adult humans are generally larger. It is even possible for humans to win a fight against a cougar, such as the case of Travis Kauffman, who choked a juvenile cougar to death when attacked while jogging. Fighting back with sticks and rocks, or even bare hands, is often effective in persuading an attacking cougar to disengage.

Before 1970

1970s

1980s

1990s

2000s

2010s

See also 
 Animal attacks
 List of fatal bear attacks in North America
 List of wolf attacks in North America
 Man-eater

References

Notes
 
 
"Mountain Lion Killing Baby a Faked Story" Santa Ana Register, Santa Ana, California. February 1, 1909. Page 5. Retrieved January 30, 2019, via Newspapers.com.

Cougar

cougar attacks in North America
Cougar